In the Australian state of Tasmania, there are many areas which are commonly known by regional names. Regions are areas that share similar characteristics. These characteristics may be natural such as the Furneaux Islands, the coastline, or the Central Highlands. Alternatively, the characteristics may be cultural, such as a viticulture land use. Tasmania is divided by numerous regional boundaries, based on different characteristics. In many cases boundaries defined by different government agencies are coterminous and are often cited by the Australian and local media that tend to distinguish between North West, West Coast, Southern, and East Coast.

Some regions were historically identified in terms of land use. In the 1960s the Atlas of Tasmania was the definitive Tasmanian Government publication in relation to regional geographical variations in Tasmania.

Local government

In Tasmania the third tier of elected government after the federal and state governments are the local government authorities, which are responsible for the local government areas. The types of LGAs in Tasmania are cities and councils.

Tasmania has 29 local government areas which have an elected council and carry out various functions delegated to them by the Tasmanian Government.

The local government areas of Tasmania are grouped into six regions:
 Central
 Hobart
 Launceston
 North-east
 North-west and west
 South-east

Australian Bureau of Statistics

The Australian Bureau of Statistics has multiple regional structures for which it analyses and reports data. These regional structures derive from the Australian Standard Geographical Classification (AGSC). The AGSC defines at the very smallest level, the Census Collection District (CCD). These CCD's aggregate to form the Statistical Local Area (SLA), which is the common base unit for each of the larger regional structures. The boundaries of the SLA are designed to be typically coterminous with Local Government Areas unless the LGA does not fit entirely into a Statistical Subdivision (SSD), or is not of a comparative nature to other LGA's. Bureau of Statistics provides statistics for Local Government Areas, as well as three other statistical structures: Statistical Divisions, Statistical Regions, and Statistical Districts.

Statistical Divisions
Statistical Divisions (SD) form the main structural hierarchy of statistical analysis. These regions are structured to provide a broad range of social, demographic and economic statistics. The basis for the boundary delineations centre on socio-economic criteria. The five divisions for Tasmania are:
Greater Hobart, Southern, Northern, Mersey-Lyell, Off-Shore Areas & Migratory.

Statistical Regions
The Statistical Region (SR) structure was established in 1986 as a means for labor force analysis.
Greater Hobart, Southern, Northern, Mersey-Lyell.

Statistical Districts
The Statistical District (SDist) is a non-capital, urban region of one or more adjoining areas, with a population of 25,000 or more. The SDist is defined with consideration of a 20-year growth forecast. The SDist does not need to conform to LGA boundaries or to state territory boundaries. The two Statistical Districts in Tasmania are:
Launceston, Burnie-Devonport.

Biogeographic regions

The Interim Biogeographic Regionalisation for Australia (IBRA) is a biogeographic regionalisation of Australia; divided into 89 bioregions and 419 subregions. Each region is a land area made up of a group of interacting ecosystems that are repeated in similar form across the landscape. Regions and subregion cross state and territory boundaries. There are nine bioregions that are located within all or part of Tasmania:
 Ben Lomond
 Furneaux
 King
 Tasmanian Central Highlands
 Tasmanian Northern Midlands
 Tasmanian Northern Slopes
 Tasmanian Southern Ranges
 Tasmanian South East
 Tasmanian West

Informal divisions

Specific uses of regions for different purposes

Weather forecasting
Since 2013, the Australian Bureau of Meteorology (BOM) divided Tasmania into eleven land-based districts for the purpose weather forecasting. In addition, the Bureau detailed nine coastal districts and a further five inshore districts covering the bays and channels in the River Derwent lower estuary.

Land based districts

 Furneaux Islands
 North East
 East Coast
 Central North (including Launceston)
 Midlands

 South East  (including Hobart)
 Upper Derwent Valley
 Central Plateau
 Western   (includes South Western and Western Tasmania)
 North West Coast
 King Island

Coastal districts

 Far North West Coast
 Central West Coast
 Southwest Coast 
 Southeast Coast 
 Southeast Inshore 

 Lower East Coast 
 Upper East Coast 
 East of Flinders Island 
 Banks Strait  (Larapuna)
 Central North Coast

Tasmanian Government

Other coastal regions
In some schemes a quadrant of the coast is made into four parts:
North West and South West -  Cape Sorell
North West and North East -  Devonport, Tasmania
North East and South East -  Bicheno, Tasmania
South West and South East -  South East Cape

In general terms, the usage is found in a number of forms:
 North West - generally starting north of the Pieman River mouth and proceeding round into the Bass Strait coast
 South West - generally starting at Cape Sorell and finishing at either South Cape or South East Cape
 South East - usually incorporates the region around Hobart and through to wineglass Bay or further north
 North East - usually referring to the coast from the Tamar River and proceeding round onto the East Coast

These regional schemes do not relate to the physical realities of the coast, or any of the coastal processes, but are simply organisational categorigisation.

Tourist regions
Tourism regions are a scheme of tourist promotion; some tourist regions are in sub-regions, or a component of separate regions, and others are grabs of separate regions.

Regions most commonly used for tourism purposes include:

 Hobart
 Huon Valley and D'Entrecasteaux Channel (Southeast)
 Derwent Valley and Central Highlands
 Launceston and the Tamar Valley
 Midlands
 North East
 Devonport and Cradle Valley
 West Coast and Wilderness.

 Tourism Tasmania, a Tasmanian Government body,  divided the state into five regions on the Tasmanian mainland, and two regions covering the two major Bass Strait islands:

 East Coast
 Flinders Island
 Hobart and South
 King Island
 Launceston and North
 North West
 West Coast

Zones have also been historically used for the purposes of public transport including: Hobart and surrounds, Launceston, Tamar and the North, North West Coast, East Coast, and Western Wilderness.

Wine regions

 Huon Valley - south of Hobart
North West - south of Devonport
 Tamar Valley - along the valley north of Launceston
 Pipers River - on the Georgetown to Bridport road.
 East Coast - between Bicheno in the north, and east of Sorell
 Coal River Valley - between Cambridge and north of Colebrook.
 Derwent Valley - between Hamilton and Hobart
 Southern - between Kingston and Southport

See also
 List of Islands of Tasmania

References

 
Coastline of Tasmania